Cham Deylavand-e Sofla (also Romanized as Cham Deylāvand-e Soflá; also known as Deylāvand-e Soflá, Deylāvand, and Dīlvand) is a village in Darb-e Gonbad Rural District, Darb-e Gonbad District, Kuhdasht County, Lorestan Province, Iran. At the 2006 census, its population was 137, in 24 families.

References 

Towns and villages in Kuhdasht County